Here Comes the Sun is the thirteenth studio album by American singer Nina Simone, consisting of cover versions of songs by pop and rock musicians, released by RCA in April 1971.

It features songs recorded in the RCA studios with a full orchestra and backing vocals. Although Simone covers songs by  Bob Dylan and The Beatles, among others, most of the versions feature arrangements substantially different from the original recordings. This is most clear in the final song "My Way", which with its fast pacing rhythm deviates significantly from the usual interpretations.

Track listing

Side one
"Here Comes the Sun" (George Harrison) - 3:37
"Just Like a Woman" (Bob Dylan) - 4:53
"O-o-h Child" (Stan Vincent) - 3:22
"Mr. Bojangles" (Jerry Jeff Walker) - 5:03

Side two
"New World Coming" (Barry Mann, Cynthia Weil) - 4:53
"Angel of the Morning" (Chip Taylor) - 3:36
"How Long Must I Wander" (Weldon Irvine) - 6:31
"My Way" (Paul Anka, Claude François, Jacques Revaux) - 5:48

Personnel
Nina Simone - piano, vocals
Corky Hale - harp
Backing vocals assembled by Howard Roberts
Orchestra assembled by Kermit Moore
Arranged by Harold Wheeler and Nina Simone
Conducted by Harold Wheeler
Sam Waymon - production coordination

Details 
"Just Like a Woman", a song by Bob Dylan. In the last verse, Simone changes the original third person perspective into first person.
"O-O-H Child", a song originally by The Five Stairsteps
"My Way", an adaptation by Paul Anka of the French song "Comme d'habitude", written by Claude François and Jacques Revaux. Simone's self-arranged version features up-tempo backing instruments (especially drums and conga) and angelic backing vocals. It is different from other interpretations in its fast-pacing rhythm and African influence.
The song "Tell It Like It Is" was also recorded during the sessions but not released till 1998 on the compilation The Very Best of Nina Simone: Sugar in My Bowl 1967–1972.

Certifications

References

Nina Simone albums
1971 albums
Covers albums
RCA Records albums
Albums produced by Harold Wheeler (musician)
Albums produced by Nat Shapiro